Nouria Merah-Benida (born October 19, 1970 in Algiers) is a former Algerian middle distance runner.

At the 1999 All-Africa Games in Johannesburg Merah-Benida won silver medals in both 800 metres and 1500 metres. At the 2000 Summer Olympics in Sydney she won an extremely surprising gold medal ahead of Romanians Violeta Szekely (silver) and Gabriela Szabo (bronze). The same year she won an 800 m silver medal and a 1500 m gold medal at the African Championships. She retired after the 2001 season.

Competition record

References

1970 births
Living people
Algerian female middle-distance runners
Athletes (track and field) at the 1996 Summer Olympics
Athletes (track and field) at the 2000 Summer Olympics
Olympic athletes of Algeria
Olympic gold medalists for Algeria
Sportspeople from Algiers
Medalists at the 2000 Summer Olympics
Olympic gold medalists in athletics (track and field)
Mediterranean Games gold medalists for Algeria
Athletes (track and field) at the 1997 Mediterranean Games
African Games silver medalists for Algeria
African Games medalists in athletics (track and field)
Mediterranean Games medalists in athletics
Athletes (track and field) at the 1999 All-Africa Games
21st-century Algerian people